The first Gandaki Provincial Assembly was elected by the 2017 provincial elections. 60 members were elected to the assembly, 36 of whom were elected through direct elections and 24 of whom were elected through the party list proportional representation system. The term of the assembly started on 4 February 2018 and ended in September 2022. Prithvi Subba Gurung from the CPN (UML) and Krishna Chandra Nepali Pokharel from the Nepali Congress served as chief ministers during the term of the assembly. Netra Nath Adhikari served as the speaker of the assembly and Srijana Sharma served as the deputy speaker.

Composition

Leaders

Speaker 

 Speaker of the Provincial Assembly: Hon. Netra Nath Adhikari
 Deputy Speaker of the Provincial Assembly: Srijana Sharma

Parliamentary Party leaders 

 Leader of the House (Nepali Congress):Hon. Krishna Chandra Nepali
 Leader of Opposition (CPN-UML):  Prithvi Subba Gurung

Whips 

 Government Chief Whip (Nepali Congress): Mani Bhadra Sharma
 Whip (Nepali Congress): Om Kala Gautam
 Opposition Chief Whip (CPN-UML): Maya Nath Adhikari

List of members

Changes

See also 

 Gandaki Province
 2017 Nepalese general election

References 

Members of the Provincial Assembly of Gandaki Province